was a Japanese real estate magnate with an estimated fortune of $5.7 billion, putting him among the five richest people in Japan. He was chairman of the Iwasaki Sangyo Group, a major transportation, tourism and hotel company in southern Japan, founded by his father, Yōhachirō Iwasaki.

Iwasaki was a resident of Kagoshima and held a bachelor's degree from Rikkyo University.

External links
Forbes.com: Forbes World's Richest People

Forbes 2007 list of billionaires estimates his net worth at $2.1 billion.

1925 births
2012 deaths
Japanese billionaires
Rikkyo University alumni
20th-century Japanese businesspeople
21st-century Japanese businesspeople
People from Kagoshima Prefecture